Lankeshwar Temple is an ancient temple dedicated to Shiva on top of a hill in the western part of the
Guwahati, Assam near the campus of Gauhati University. Lankeshwar is one of the many forms of Lord Shiva. The followers of Lord Shiva considered the temple as one of the most sacred one. Devotees all around the year visit this temple and seek divine blessings.

The Lankeshwar Temple in Guwahati is not only popular with religiously inclined people but with the general tourists also. Most common visitors are amongst the couples of Guwahati city, students of Gauhati University, and that of Assam Engineering College.  

Guwahati City Bus Number 6 provides with direct public transportation.

Gallery

References 

Hindu temples in Guwahati
Shiva temples in Assam